Winnie M Li is an American writer, novelist and activist.

Li's first novel, Dark Chapter, released in 2017, was based on her own experience of a stranger rape in 2008.

Early life and education
Winnie Li was born in New Haven, Connecticut, to Taiwanese immigrants. Her family lived in Pennsylvania before settling in Wayne, New Jersey. After graduating from high school, she attended Harvard University where she majored in Folklore and Mythology. After graduating Phi Beta Kappa from Harvard, she moved to Cork, Ireland, to pursue an MA in English at National University of Ireland, Cork. In 2000 Li was selected in the inaugural class of George Mitchell Scholars.

Rape
In April 2008 Li was raped by a 15 year old boy in Colin Glen Forest Park in Belfast. Li was in Belfast to attend a conference to celebrate the 10-year anniversary of the Northern Ireland peace process. Li suffered 39 separate injuries from the assault. The case caused outcry in Belfast and received national media attention. A community vigil was held in the park a week after the assault. The perpetrator was arrested and ultimately convicted.

Writing and activism
In the aftermath of the assault Li began writing about her experience. Li contributed an essay about her assault to the book Sushi and Tapas in 2011. Li wrote several articles for the Huffington Post starting in 2014 on her assault and broader themes of sexual violence. In 2015 Li co-founded the Clear Lines Festival, addressing themes of sexual assault and consent through the arts and discussion. Li regularly appears on BBC and Sky News commenting on themes of sexual abuse and violence. Li has also had featured interviews in The Guardian, The Times, The Irish Times, The Irish Examiner, The LA Review of Books and Ms Magazine. In 2018, Li received an honorary doctorate from the National University of Ireland for her contribution to the arts in the advocacy of women's rights.

Li's writings have appeared in a variety of magazines and newspapers including The Guardian, The Times, The Mail on Sunday, The Stylist and The Huffington Post.

Dark Chapter
In 2017 Li published her first novel Dark Chapter, a fictionalised account of the rape written from the perspective of both the victim and perpetrator. The book won the Guardian newspaper's Not the Booker Prize in 2017. Dark Chapter was also nominated for The Edgar Award for best first novel and shortlisted for The Authors' Club Best first novel award. The book has been translated into ten languages.

References

External links
 Winnie Li's personal website
 Winnie Li on IMDB
 'Reframing the way we think we think about sexual violence' talk for TedX London

American women writers
Alumni of University College Cork
Harvard College alumni
Living people
Year of birth missing (living people)
21st-century American women